The Day of the founding of the German Empire was an annual celebration on the anniversary of the proclamation of the German Empire on 18 January 1871 in the Palace of Versailles. 

The North German Confederation had already officially adopted the name "German Reich" in its Constitution by 1 January 1871, so constitutionally speaking, 18 January was not the day of the founding.

Celebrations 
Celebrations were held annually on 18 January. At centralised and local events, patriotic speeches were held and songs such as Heil dir im Siegerkranz, the unofficial anthem of the empire were sung. Celebrations also took place publicly during the Weimar Republic (1919–1933) and with the participation of high dignitaries. Nazi Germany only celebrated the founding of the German Empire in 1871.

East Germany completely abolished this custom. On 18 January 1971, West Germany issued a motif of special stamps for the 100th anniversary of the founding of the Empire on 30 Pfennig stamps (Michel catalogue 658 and 385) designed by the Deutsche Bundespost Berlin. This corresponded to the rate for a standard letter at the time. On 24 November 1971, a commemorative coin was struck with a nominal value of five Deutsche Marks which paid tribute to the same event.

Some adherents of the political right continued this tradition. Also, some student connections celebrated Reichsgründungskneipen (Imperial Founding Pubs).

See also 
 Proclamation of the German Empire (paintings)
 Unification of Germany

Further reading 
 Fritz Schellack: Nationalfeiertage in Deutschland von 1871 bis 1945. Frankfurt am Main [u. a.] 1990, S. 161 f., 193 ff., 261 ff.

Observances in Germany
Former public holidays